William S. Rahauser was the Allegheny County District Attorney from January 1948 to January 1952 and was a member of the Democratic Party.  A native of suburban Coraopolis, Pennsylvania he started in politics with wins as a Pennsylvania State Senator in the 1940s, he went on to become a District Judge in Pittsburgh.

See also

 District Attorney
 Pittsburgh Police
 Allegheny County Sheriff
 Allegheny County Police Department

References

Lawyers from Pittsburgh
County district attorneys in Pennsylvania
Pennsylvania Democrats